The Ministry of Commerce and Industry is a ministry of the Government of Haiti. This ministry is responsible for commerce and industry throughout the country, along with playing an integral role in the Prime Minister's Cabinet.

See also

References

Commerce
Haiti
Economy of Haiti